René Alejandro Pontoni (born May 18, 1920, in Santa Fe, Argentina, died May 14, 1983) was a footballer. He played club football in Argentina, Colombia and Brazil as well as representing the Argentina national football team on 19 occasions.

Biography
Pontoni started his career with Gimnasia y Esgrima de Santa Fe before joining Newell's Old Boys in 1940. Pontoni made his debut for the Argentina national team in 1942. He went on to score 19 goals in 19 games for his country, helping them to become South American champions in 1945, 1946 and 1947.

In 1944 Pontoni joined San Lorenzo where he helped the team to win the Primera División in 1946. In 1948 he suffered a career threatening injury but he recovered, moving to Colombia in 1949 to play for Independiente Santa Fe where he remained until 1952.

In 1953 Pontoni moved to Brazil, where he spent one season with Portuguesa in São Paulo before returning to Argentina for one last season with San Lorenzo in 1954.

Titles

Later years
In 1963 former Boca Juniors player Mario Boyé and former San Lorenzo de Almagro player René Pontoni, brothers-in-law who had both been members of Argentine national teams, set up a pizzería in Belgrano, Buenos Aires, La Guitarrita, still run by Pontoni's grandson . Pontoni also had several spells as a football manager in the lower leagues of Argentine football.

References

Footballers from Santa Fe, Argentina
Argentine people of Italian descent
Argentine footballers
Association football forwards
Argentina international footballers
Argentine expatriate footballers
Newell's Old Boys footballers
San Lorenzo de Almagro footballers
Independiente Santa Fe footballers
Associação Portuguesa de Desportos players
Argentine Primera División players
Categoría Primera A players
Expatriate footballers in Brazil
Expatriate footballers in Colombia
Argentine football managers
San Lorenzo de Almagro managers
Independiente Santa Fe managers
1920 births
1983 deaths
Copa América-winning players